Polo Prince was a New Zealand Thoroughbred racehorse who won the 1964 Melbourne Cup.

Having run an excellent fourth in the VRC Mackinnon Stakes and allotted just 8 st 3 lb (52 kg) for the cup he was backed from 20/1 to 12/1 to win the race which he did in near record time.

Unfortunately, he died in 1973 after being struck by a car.

References

Melbourne Cup winners
1958 racehorse births
1973 racehorse deaths
Racehorses bred in New Zealand
Racehorses trained in New Zealand
Thoroughbred family 18